Maydh (also transliterated as Mait or Meit) is an ancient port city in the eastern Sanaag region of Somaliland.

History

Antiquity

According to Augustus Henry Keane, Maydh represents an early center of dispersal of the Somali people. National genealogies collected by the scholars Cox and Abud assert that many clan patriarchs are buried in or nearby the town.

Medieval
The city of Maydh was home to Sheikh Isaaq ibn Ahmed Al Hashimi (Sheekh Isaxaaq), who moved to Somaliland from the Arabian Peninsula in the 12th or 13th century CE. He is considered to be the founding father of the large Somali Isaaq clan family that predominantly inhabits Somaliland, as well as parts of Djibouti and Ethiopia. Sheikh Isaaq's domed tomb is also located here. According to tradition, the old town was built by Sheikh Ishaaq and his followers upon earlier foundations.

Legendary 15th century Arab explorer Ahmad ibn Mājid wrote of Maydh and several other notable landmarks and ports of the northern Somali coast, including Berbera, the Sa'ad ad-Din islands (aka the Zeila Archipelago near Zeila), Alula, Ruguda, Heis, El-Darad and El-Sheikh.

Somaliland in general is home to numerous such archaeological sites, with similar edifices found at Haylaan, Qa’ableh, Qombo'ul, Gelweita and El Ayo. However, many of these old structures have yet to be properly explored, a process which would help shed further light on the local history of the region and facilitate their preservation for posterity.

Portuguese navigator Duarte Barbosa described the Somali coast and noted Met (Maydh) as a town with an abundance of meat but little trade. This would indicate that Maydh was likely a pilgrimage site where travelers would come to pray.

Early Modern
Maydh shares many similarities with nearby Heis the Habr Yunis attained a lot of frankincense in the mountains south of Maydh. Arab and Banyan merchants would visit the port before continuing on to the western Somali coast. Maydh was the preeminent export point for large hides in eastern British Somaliland and came second in the total quantity of skins exported after Heis with over 15,000 being shipped out. The town had dialogue with Berbera with a large amount of cross trade occurring usually by dhow and the largest commodity being livestock.

Murray in his book The Journal of the Royal Geographical Society notes that many men from the western Isaaq clans would travel to Maydh to spend the last years of their lives in hopes of being buried near Sheikh Ishaaq. The book states:

Modern
The town is now mostly fishing town and is exclusively settled by the Muse Carre sub division of the Habar Yoonis Garxajis of the Isaaq clan. In 2020 the British, Dutch and Norwegian missions announced the start of a jetty in Maydh to bolster economic activity and construction is in progress.

See also
Administrative divisions of Somaliland
Regions of Somaliland
Districts of Somaliland
Somalia–Somaliland border

Heis
Karin
Haylan
Qa’ableh
Qombo'ul

References

Populated places in Sanaag
Isaaq Sultanate